Harold George White (March 18, 1919 – April 21, 2001) was an American professional baseball player, a right-handed pitcher for the Detroit Tigers (1941–43 and 1946–52), St. Louis Browns (1953) and St. Louis Cardinals (1953–1954). White served in the United States Navy in the Pacific Theater of Operations during World War II.

In twelve seasons, White had a 46–54 win–loss record, 336 games (67 started), 23 complete games, 7 shutouts, 144 games finished, 25 saves, 920 innings pitched, 875 hits allowed, 443 runs allowed, 387 earned runs allowed, 47 home runs allowed, 450 walks allowed, 349 strikeouts, 14 hit batsmen, 20 wild pitches, 3,986 batters faced, 2 balks, and a 3.78 ERA.

White died in Venice, Florida at the age of 82. A veteran, he was buried at Sarasota National Cemetery in Sarasota County, Florida.

References

External links

1919 births
2001 deaths
Baseball players from New York (state)
Buffalo Bisons (minor league) players
Detroit Tigers players
Louisville Colonels (minor league) players
Major League Baseball pitchers
Oakland Oaks (baseball) players
Sportspeople from Utica, New York
Rome Colonels players
St. Louis Browns players
St. Louis Cardinals players
Syracuse Chiefs players
Toledo Mud Hens players
Wilkes-Barre Barons (baseball) players
Burials at Florida National Cemetery